A  is a traditional Japanese raincoat made out of straw. Traditional  are an article of outerwear covering the entire body, although shorter ones resembling grass skirts were also historically used to cover the lower body alone. Similar straw capes were also used in China, Vietnam and Korea.

Overview

Rice straw has naturally water-repellent properties, with water droplets that hit a mat of straw tending to flow along the length of the fibres, rather than penetrating underneath it. For this reason, early Japanese rain gear was often made of straw, which had the added benefit of being cheap to acquire, easy to weave and fasten, and being light in weight; however, this rain gear was also bulky in size, and highly flammable. In earlier eras, straw clothing had the additional advantage of affording a significant degree of camouflage in certain terrain, including forests and wetlands, similar to modern ghillie suits.

As synthetic fibers and later plastics were introduced to Japan,  lost much of their practicality and fell out of use.

Popular culture 
 is a 1691 anthology of Bashō-school poetry. It is widely considered to be one of the most important compilations of classical Japanese verse.

This means that Burmy's Japanese name roughly translates to mean "a cutie in a straw coat".

See also
Straw hat
Asian conical hat
Thatching

References

External links

 Signboard for Mino seller in Torii-no-moto (Hikone, Shiga prefecture) on the Nakasendo route (June 2017).

Japanese full-body garments
Outerwear
Straw objects
Japanese words and phrases